This is a list of developmental and minor sports leagues, two concepts which are largely restricted to North American sports. Note that this does not include teams in leagues that include promotion and relegation.

North America

Baseball

 Minor League Baseball
 International League (Class AAA)
 Pacific Coast League (Class AAA)
 Eastern League (Class AA)
 Southern League (Class AA)
 Texas League (Class AA)
 Midwest League (Class A+)
 Northwest League (Class A+)
 South Atlantic League (Class A+)
 California League (Class A)
 Carolina League (Class A)
 Florida State League (Class A)
 Arizona Complex League (rookie)
 Florida Complex League (rookie)
 Dominican Summer League (rookie)
Off-season leagues
 Arizona Fall League (off-season)
 Colombian Professional Baseball League (off-season)
 Dominican Winter Baseball League (off-season)
 Mexican Pacific League (off-season)
 Puerto Rico Baseball League (off-season)
 Venezuelan Professional Baseball League (off-season)
 Independent baseball leagues
 American Association 
 Atlantic League 
 Empire League
 Frontier League 
 Mexican League
 Pecos League
 Pioneer League 
 United Shore League
  MLB Partner Leagues

Basketball
Affiliated:
NBA G League
NBA Summer League

Independent:

Pro
Canadian Elite Basketball League (CEBL)
National Basketball League of Canada (NBL Canada)
The Basketball League (TBL)
The Basketball Tournament (TBT)

Semi-Pro
American Basketball Association (ABA)
Canadian Elite Basketball League (CEBL)
Central Basketball Association (CBA)
East Coast Basketball League (ECBL)
Elite Basketball League (EBL)
Florida Basketball Association (FBA)
Maximum Basketball League (MBL)
National Basketball League of Canada (NBL Canada)
North American Basketball League (NABL)
 Premier Basketball League (PBL)

United Basketball League (UBL)
Universal Basketball Association (UBA)

American football
Outdoor:

High-level
 United States Football League 
 XFL 

Mid-level
 Major League Football

Low-level
 Gridiron Developmental Football League
 Liga de Fútbol Americano Profesional 
 Rivals Professional Football League 

Indoor:

High-level
Fan Controlled Football
Indoor Football League
National Arena League

Mid-level
Champions Indoor Football

Low-level
Arena Football Association
American Arena League
American West Football Conference

Ice hockey
Professional:
American Hockey League (high-level)
ECHL (formerly East Coast Hockey League) (mid-level)
Federal Prospects Hockey League (low-level)
Ligue Nord-Américaine de Hockey (low-level)
Southern Professional Hockey League (low-level)

Juniors:
Canadian Hockey League (CHL; an umbrella organization)
Ontario Hockey League (Major junior)
Quebec Major Junior Hockey League (Major junior)
Western Hockey League (Major junior)
United States Hockey League (Tier I)

Association football (soccer)
United Soccer League 
 USL Championship (men's Division II)
 USL Super League (women's Division II, planned to start in 2023)
 USL League One (men's Division III)
 USL W League (women's Division III)
 MLS Next Pro (Division III)
 National Independent Soccer Association (Division III)
 United Women's Soccer (women's Division II)
 Women's Premier Soccer League (women's Division II)

Indoor soccer
Major Arena Soccer League 2 (M2)

Auto racing
ARCA Menards Series
American Speed Association
CRA
Indy NXT
Pro Mazda Championship
NASCAR Pinty's Series (Canada)
NASCAR Peak Mexico Series (Mexico)
NASCAR Whelen Euro Series (Europe)
NASCAR Whelen Modified Tour
NASCAR Whelen Southern Modified Tour
NASCAR K&N Pro Series East
NASCAR K&N Pro Series West
Michelin Pilot Challenge
GT4 America

Cricket 

 Minor League Cricket

Africa

Rugby union
 Vodacom Cup (South Africa; now defunct. During the competition's existence, teams from Argentina and Namibia were occasionally included.)
 Rugby Challenge (South Africa; successor to the Vodacom Cup. Includes the same Namibian team that occasionally featured in the Vodacom Cup.)

Asia

Baseball
Baseball Challenge League (Japan)
Eastern League (Japan)
Kansai Independent Baseball League (Japan)
Shikoku-Kyūshū Island League (Japan)
Western League (Japan)

Basketball
National Basketball League (China)
Philippine Basketball League (Philippines, 1983-2011)
Liga Pilipinas (Philippines, 2008-2011)
PBA Developmental League (Philippines, 2011–present)
Filsports Basketball Association (Philippines, 2015-2016)
Pilipinas Commercial Basketball League (Philippines, 2015-2016)
Community Basketball Association (Philippines, 2019–present)

Association football
Manila Football League (Philippines, 1930-1967)
Manila Premier Football League (Philippines, 1997)
National Football League (Philippines, 1977-1991)
PFA Major Soccer Series (Philippines, 1967-1972)
Filipino Premier League (Philippines, 2008)
United Football League (Philippines), (2009-2016)

Europe

Motorsports 

 European Le Mans
 GT4 European Series
 GT4 France Cup

Oceania

Association football (soccer)
National Premier Leagues (Australia)

Australian rules football
TAC Cup (Victoria)
South Australian National Football League (South Australia)
Victorian Football League (Victoria)
West Australian Football League (Western Australia)
North East Australian Football League (New South Wales, Queensland, Northern Territory & Australian Capital Territory)

Baseball
Darwin Baseball League (Northern Territory)
Greater Brisbane League (Queensland)
Illawarra Baseball League (New South Wales)
New South Wales Major League (New South Wales)

Basketball
 Big V (Victoria)
 NBL1 (Australia)
 NBL1 Central (South Australia)
 NBL1 East (New South Wales and Australian Capital Territory)
 NBL1 North (Queensland and Northern Territory)
 NBL1 South (Victoria, Tasmania, and South Australia)
 NBL1 West (Western Australia)

Ice hockey
East Coast Super League (New South Wales)

Rugby league
Melbourne Rugby League (Victoria)
New South Wales Cup (New South Wales)
Queensland Cup (Queensland)
S. G. Ball Cup (Australia)

Motorsports 

 Super2 Series
 Super3 Series

See also
List of top level minor league sports teams in the United States by city
List of American and Canadian cities by number of major professional sports franchises
List of professional sports teams in the United States and Canada
Minor league

Developmental